Frightmare is a 1988 platform game published by Accolade under their Avantage budget label and Cascade Games. The game was released on floppy disk for the IBM PC, ZX Spectrum  and Commodore 64.

Gameplay
The game is a platformer where players control a character within a dreamworld trying to overcome a nightmare. Players encounter enemies including ghosts, ghoulies, and monsters and must avoid them by jumping and climbing around them, or must defeat them using a variety of weapons. Players progress through many screens across various levels to complete the game by advancing the alarm clock
from midnight to 8:12 A.M.

Reception

Richard C. Leinecker, reviewing the PC DOS version of the game for Compute! magazine, noted that the game suffered from poor documentation containing numerous errors. The documentation also only explained how to use a joystick, although the game can be played with a keyboard. He also found mistakes in the programming such as the character sprite appearing out of position, either just above or below ledges and objects in the game. He speculated that the sloppy programming may be a consequence of trying to keep costs down for a budget title.

References

1988 video games
Commodore 64 games
DOS games
Platform games
Video games developed in the United States
ZX Spectrum games